Camillo is an Italian masculine given name, descended from Latin Camillus. Its Slavic cognate is Kamil.

People with the name include:

Camillo Agrippa, Italian Renaissance fencer, architect, engineer and mathematician
Camillo Almici (1714–1779), Italian priest, theologian and literary critic
Camillo Astalli (1616–1663), Italian cardinal
Camillo Benso, conte di Cavour (1810–1861), a leading figure in the movement toward Italian unification, founder of the original Italian Liberal Party and Prime Minister of the Kingdom of Piedmont-Sardinia
Camillo Berlinghieri (1590 or 1605–1635), Italian painter
Camillo Berneri (1897–1937), Italian professor of philosophy, anarchist militant, propagandist and theorist
Camillo Boccaccino (c. 1504–1546), Italian painter
Camillo Boito (1836–1914), Italian architect, engineer, art critic, art historian and novelist
Camillo Borghese (1550–1621), Pope Paul V, the Pope who persecuted Galileo Galilei
Camillo Borghese, 6th Prince of Sulmona (1775–1832), brother-in-law of Napoleon
Camillo Camilli (c. 1704–1754), master luthier
Camillo Castiglioni (1879–1957), Italian-Austrian financier and banker
Camillo Federici (1749–1802), Italian dramatist and actor
Camillo Finocchiaro Aprile (1851–1916), Italian jurist and politician
Camillo Golgi (1843–1926), Italian physician, pathologist, scientist, and Nobel laureate
Camillo Jerusalem (1914–1979), Austrian football player
Camillo Laurenti (1861–1938), Italian Roman Catholic cardinal
Count Camillo Marcolini (1739–1814), minister and general director of the fine arts for the Electorate, later Kingdom of Saxony
Camillo Mariani (1565–1611), Italian sculptor
Camillo Massimo (1620–1677), Italian cardinal
Camillo Mastrocinque (1901–1969), Italian film director and screenwriter
Camillo Mazzella (1833–1900), Italian Jesuit theologian and cardinal
Camillo Olivetti (1868–1943), Italian electrical engineer and founder of Olivetti & Co., SpA.
Camillo Pacetti (1758–1826), Italian sculptor
Camillo Francesco Maria Pamphili (1622–1666), Italian cardinal and nobleman
Camillo Pilotto (1890–1963), Italian film actor
Camillo Procaccini (1551–1629), Italian painter
Camillo Rizzi (1580–1618), Italian painter
Camillo Rondani (1808–1879), Italian entomologist
Camillo Ruini (born 1931), Italian Roman Catholic cardinal
Camillo Rusconi (1658–1728), Italian sculptor
Camillo Sitte (1843–1903), Austrian architect, painter and city planning theoretician
Camillo Sivori (1815–1894), Italian virtuoso violinist and composer
Camillo Tarquini (1810–1874), Italian cardinal, Jesuit canonist and archaeologist
Camillo Togni (1922–1993), Italian composer, teacher and pianist
Camillo Ugi (1884–1970), German football player
Camillo Vaz (born 1975), French football manager
Camillo Walzel (1829–1895), German librettist and theatre director

Fictional characters include:
Don Camillo, in the short stories of Italian writer and journalist Giovannino Guareschi

See also
Camilo (disambiguation)

Italian masculine given names